"Always" (stylized as lower-caps) is a song by Japanese singer Mai Kuraki. It was released on June 6, 2001 by Giza Studio and used as the twelfth ending theme to the Case Closed and the theme song to the Japanese animated movie Countdown to Heaven.

Track listing

Charts

Weekly charts

Monthly charts

Year-end charts

Certification and sales

References

2001 singles
2001 songs
Mai Kuraki songs
Giza Studio singles
Case Closed songs
Japanese film songs
Songs written for animated films
Songs written by Aika Ohno
Songs written by Mai Kuraki
Song recordings produced by Daiko Nagato